The 1874 Nova Scotia general election was held on 17 December 1874 to elect members of the 26th House of Assembly of the Province of Nova Scotia, Canada. It was won by the Liberal party.

Results

Results by party

Retiring incumbents
Liberal
John Flinn, Halifax
David C. Landers, Annapolis
John Ross, Victoria
William Henry Smith, Queens
John Taylor, Halifax
Jared C. Troop, Annapolis
William Berrian Vail, Digby
Henry Yeomans, Hants

Liberal-Conservative
Hiram Blanchard, Inverness
Samuel Rettie, Colchester

Nominated candidates
1874 Nova Scotia Provincial Election

Legend
bold denotes party leader
† denotes an incumbent who is not running for re-election or was defeated in nomination contest

Valley

|-
| rowspan="2"|Annapolis	
|
|E. Bent1,01323.05%
||
|Avard Longley1,21127.55%	
|
|
||
|Jared C. Troop†
|-	
|
| Parker99422.62%
||
|William Botsford Troop1,17726.78%	
|
|
||
|David C. Landers†
|-
| rowspan="2"|Digby
||
|Henri M. Robicheau96730.28%	
|
|John Chipman Wade57417.98%
|
|
||
|William Berrian Vail†
|-	
|
|Urbine Doucette52916.57%	
|
|	
||
|Colin Campbell (Anti-Confederate)1,12335.17%
||
|Urbine Doucette
|-
| rowspan="2"|Hants	
|
|Thomas Barlow Smith1,33231.68%
||
|William Henry Allison1,46334.80%	
|
|
||
|Thomas Barlow Smith
|-	
|
|
||
|Alfred Putnam1,40933.52%	
|
|
||
|Henry Yeomans†
|-
| rowspan="2"|Kings	
|
|Daniel Charles Moore1,02722.95%
|
|
||
|John B. North1,17126.17%
||
|Daniel Charles Moore
|-	
|
|Henry Shaw1,01622.71%	
||
|Douglas Benjamin Woodworth1,26028.16%
|
|
||
|Vacant
|-
|}

South Shore

|-
| rowspan="2"|Lunenburg
||
|James Daniel Eisenhauer1,50728.95%	
|
|William Young1,14822.06%	
|
|
||
|James Daniel Eisenhauer
|-
||
|Mather Byles DesBrisay1,42327.34%	
|
|Edward James1,12721.65%	
|
|
||
|Mather Byles DesBrisay
|-
| rowspan="2"|Queens
||
|Isaac N. Mack74032.46%	
|
|Charles Allison44119.34%	
|
|
||
|William Henry Smith†
|-
||
|Samuel Freeman70530.92%	
|
|George Starrat Parker39417.28%	
|
|
||
|Samuel Freeman
|-
| rowspan="2"|Shelburne
||
|Thomas JohnstonAcclamation
|
|
|
|
||
|Thomas Johnston
|-
||
|Robert RobertsonAcclamation
|
|	
|
|
||
|Robert Robertson
|-
| rowspan="3"|Yarmouth
||
|Albert Gayton1,64145.70%	
|
|
|
|
||
|Albert Gayton
|-
||
|John Lovitt1,21133.72%
|rowspan=2|
|rowspan=2|
|rowspan=2|
|rowspan=2|
|rowspan=2 |
|rowspan=2|John K. Ryerson
|-
|
|John K. Ryerson73920.58%	
|}

Fundy-Northeast

|-
| rowspan="3"|Colchester
||
|John Barnhill Dickie1,68730.25%
|
|	
|
|
||
|Samuel Rettie†
|-	
|
|Thomas Fletcher Morrison1,04618.76%	
|rowspan=2 |
|rowspan=2|William Albert Patterson1,71830.81%
|rowspan=2|
|rowspan=2|
|rowspan=2 |
|rowspan=2|Thomas Fletcher Morrison
|-
|
|Robert Putman1,12620.19%
|-
| rowspan="2"|Cumberland
|
|
|
|Charles James Townsend1,20922.92%
||
|Hiram Black1,46127.70%	
||
|Vacant
|-
||
|Amos Purdy1,30424.72%	
|
|Edward Vickery1,30124.66%
|
|
||
|Edward Vickery
|-
|}

Halifax

|-
| rowspan="3"|Halifax
||
|Philip Carteret Hill2,86220.88%	
|
|Robert Sedgewick1,83713.40%	
|
|
||
|John Taylor†
|-
||
|Donald Archibald2,85320.81%	
|
|W. J. Almon1,81813.26%	
|
|
||
|Donald Archibald
|-
||
|Edward Farrell2,70919.76%	
|
|M. J. Griffin1,63011.89%	
|
|
||
|John Flinn†
|-
|}

Central Nova

|-
| rowspan="2"|Antigonish
||
|Daniel MacDonald75231.01%	
|
|
|
|
||
|Daniel MacDonald
|-	
|
|Joseph MacDonald66127.26%	
||
|John J. McKinnon1,01241.73%
|
|
||
|Joseph MacDonald
|-
| rowspan="3"|Guysborough
||
|Charles M. Franchville68228.26%	
|
|Stewart Campbell44018.23%	
|
|
||
|Charles M. Franchville
|-
|rowspan=2 |
|rowspan=2|William Henry Wylde62826.03%	
|
|Alexander N. McDonald36215.00%
|rowspan=2|
|rowspan=2|
|rowspan=2 |
|rowspan=2|William Henry Wylde
|-
|
|Joseph William Hadley30112.47%
|-
| rowspan="3"|Pictou	
|
|
||
|Alexander MacKayAcclamation
|
|
||
|Alexander MacKay
|-	
|
|
||
|Simon Hugh HolmesAcclamation
|
|
||
|Simon Hugh Holmes
|-	
|
|
||
|Hugh J. CameronAcclamation
|
|
||
|Hugh J. Cameron
|-
|}

Cape Breton

|-
| rowspan="2"|Cape Breton
||
|Alonzo J. White1,12934.19%
|
|John Currie2046.19%
|
|
||
|Alonzo J. White
|-	
|
|John Fergusson62618.96%	
|
|A. G. Hamilton3049.21%
||
|Ebenezer Tilton Moseley1,03931.47%
||
|John Fergusson
|-
| rowspan="2"|Inverness
|
|Alexander Campbell1,30924.06%
|
|	
||
|John J. McKinnon1,39025.55%
||
|Hiram Blanchard†
|-	
|
|Hugh McDonald1,26023.16%	
|
|	
||
|Duncan J. Campbell1,48227.24%
||
|Duncan J. Campbell
|-
| rowspan="2"|Richmond	
|
|
|
|
||
|Charles BoudroitAcclamation
||
|Charles Boudroit
|-	
|
|	
||
|Murdoch McRaeAcclamation	
|
|
||
|Murdoch McRae
|-
| rowspan="2"|Victoria
||
|David McCurdy68033.93%	
|
|John Angus Morrison38219.06%	
|
|
||
|David McCurdy
|-
||
|John A. Fraser54827.35%	
|
|	
|
|William Kidston39419.66%
||
|John Ross†
|-
|}

References

1874
1874 elections in Canada
1874 in Nova Scotia
December 1874 events